Yaroslavl Governorate (Yaroslavskaya guberniya)  was an administrative division (a guberniya) of the Russian Empire and the Russian SFSR, located in European Russia in the Upper Volga Region. It existed from 1777 to 1929; its seat was in the city of Yaroslavl.

Administrative division
Yaroslavl Governorate consisted of the following uyezds (administrative centres in parentheses):

 Danilovsky Uyezd (Danilov)
 Lyubimsky Uyezd (Lyubim)
 Mologsky Uyezd (Mologa)
 Myshkinsky Uyezd (Myshkin)
 Poshekhonsky Uyezd (Poshekhonye)
 Romanovo-Borisoglebsky Uyezd (Romanov-Borisoglebsk)
 Rostovsky Uyezd (Rostov)
 Rybinsky Uyezd (Rybinsk)
 Uglichsky Uyezd (Uglich)
 Yaroslavsky Uyezd (Yaroslavl)

References

External links
Ярославская губерния

 
Governorates of the Russian Empire
Governorates of the Russian Soviet Federative Socialist Republic
1777 establishments in the Russian Empire
States and territories disestablished in 1929